Ethan Thomas Robert Johns (born 1969 in Merton, London, England) is an English record producer, engineer, mixer, songwriter, and multi-instrumentalist. Johns has worked with artists including Ryan Adams, Kings of Leon, Paul McCartney, Ray LaMontagne, Tom Jones, Kaiser Chiefs, Rufus Wainwright, The Boxer Rebellion, Crowded House, Lauren Hoffman, The Vaccines, Laura Marling, The Staves, and Crosby, Stills and Nash. In 2012, he won the Brit Award for Best British Producer.

Although Johns is primarily a record producer, mixer and engineer, the multi-instrumentalist has also toured with acts including Emmylou Harris, Ryan Adams, Ray LaMontagne and Tom Jones. He owns the indie record label Three Crows Music. Johns also runs Three Crows Records within Warner/Atlantic. Johns is the son of notable record producer and engineer Glyn Johns (The Rolling Stones, Eric Clapton, Led Zeppelin and The Who). 

Johns released his debut solo album Independent Years (1991) followed by If Not Now Then When? on vinyl in November 2012, which was later released in other formats in February 2013. His second album titled The Reckoning was released in mid-2014, and was produced by Ryan Adams. His third album Silver Liner was released in November 2015. His fourth and most recent album Anamnesis was released in 2018. Johns spent 15 years in Los Angeles as a record producer and musician, but currently lives and continues to make records in England.

Discography

Solo discography
 Independent Years (1991)
 If Not Now Then When? (2012)
 The Reckoning (2014)
 Silver Liner (2015)
 Anamnesis (2018)

Selected production credits

As musician 
 Drums, guitar, mandolin on John Hiatt's Stolen Moments (1990)
 Drums on Fish's Internal Exile (1991)
 Guitar on Mike Peters & The Poets of Justice "Exodus Tour" (1992)
 Guitar, Drums, Producer,  on Andy Stine's Time Waits (1993).
 Electric and acoustic guitar, drums, percussion, and mandocello on Crosby, Stills and Nash's After the Storm (1994)
 Drums on Joe Satriani – Joe Satriani "Luminous Flesh Giants" (1995)
 Guitar, drums, percussion, omnichord, EBow, mandocello on Emmylou Harris "Red Dirt Girl" (2000)
 Guitar, drums, percussion, mandocello, marksaphone, optigon, dulcimer, synth bass on Emmylou Harris/Linda Ronstadt "Western Wall, The Tucson Sessions" (1999)
 Drums, bass, mandolin, mandocello, keyboards, percussion and guitars on Whiskeytown's Pnenmonia (2001) – also producer
 Drums, guitar, mandocello, percussion, Hammond organ, vocals on Ryan Adams Gold (2001) – also producer
 Drums and guitar on Luthea Salom Out of Without (2001)
 Guitar, percussion on Tift Merritt Bramble Rose (2002) – also producer
 Percussion, piano, drums, harmonium, bass and additional guitars on Ray Lamontagne Trouble (2004) – also producer
 Drums on Dave Palmer's Romance (2006) – also producer
 Drums on Ryan Adams 29 (2005) – also producer
 Drums in the Backing band for the Ray Lamontagne Tour for Gossip in the Grain
 Hammond organ, celesta, mandolin, mellotron, omnichord, electric and acoustic guitars, ukulele, dobro, mandocello, bass, tic tac bass, optigan, percussion on Paolo Nutini Sunny Side Up (2009) – also producer
 Drums on Howard Eliott Payne "Bright Light Ballads" (2009) – also producer
 Conductor of BBC Concert Orchestra on BBC Music's cover of God Only Knows (2014) (also producer)
Drums, Guitar, Guitar (12 String Electric), Guitar (Acoustic), Guitar (Electric), Guitar (Leslie), Musician, Shaker, Slide Guitar, Tiple, Vocal Harmony on Benmont Tench / You Should Be So Lucky (2014)

References

External links 
 

Living people
1969 births
Brit Award winners
English audio engineers
English record producers
English songwriters
Mixing engineers
Date of birth missing (living people)